Catherine Fulvio (née Byrne) is an Irish TV chef, food writer, author, and proprietor of 'Ballyknocken House & Cookery School.'

Early life
Fulvio was born and raised at Ballyknocken House in Glenealy, Co Wicklow. Fulvio is the second eldest of 4 children, along with brothers Paul and Karl and sister Eithne. She and her siblings were raised on a farm at Ballyknocken, where they regularly helped with daily farm work. Fulvio attributes her love of food to her upbringing on the farm and around food production.

Career
Since 2004, Fulvio has been the principal proprietor of Ballyknocken House Bed & Breakfast, which she later extended to include Ballyknocken Cookery School. She has since gone on to host regular cooking classes in the school and fund-raising cookery events, drawing crowds of up to 600. Fulvio is also a well-known TV personality in Ireland, the UK, and the US, and has authored multiple cookbooks.

TV work 
Fulvio has hosted and featured on a number of cooking-related TV shows, both in Ireland and abroad. Most notably, she was nominated for a Daytime Emmy award for Outstanding Culinary Host for her US TV series “A Taste of Ireland” on Recipe TV. Fulvio has also featured or hosted a number of other TV shows including: 

Lords & Ladles – originally on RTÉ, now also streaming in other territories on Netflix and Amazon Prime Video. 

Tastes Like Home - RTÉ

Saturday Kitchen - 

BBC
A Taste of Success - RTÉ Player 

Catherine Celebrates - RTÉ
Catherine’s Italian Kitchen – 

RTÉ
Catherine’s Roman Holiday – 

RTÉ
Catherine’s Family Kitchen – 

RTÉ
The Today Show - 

NBC
The Best Christmas Food Ever – 

BBC iPlayer

Ballyknocken 
After the death of her mother, Fulvio took over the management of the Ballyknocken House Bed & Breakfast, a 4-star Victorian-style guesthouse located 47 km from Dublin in County Wicklow. Customers would often ask her how she made various dishes for the BNB meals, and from this, she got the idea to open a cookery school. The Ballyknocken Cookery School was opened in 2004 on the grounds of Ballyknocken House. Ballyknocken House & Cookery School remains open to this day and offers guests relaxing weekend breaks, cookery classes, and nearby access to Wicklow beauty spots such as Glendalough and Brittas Bay.As a result of the 2020 COVID-19 Pandemic, Ballyknocken had to temporarily close the doors of both the B&B and Cookery School. Fulvio made the most of the situation by recording all of her cookery classes and making them available as online cooking classes through her website.

Writing 
As of 2021, Fulvio has authored six cookery books covering various meals and cooking styles, from Italian dishes to baking recipes. Fulvio is also a weekly food columnist for the RTÉ Guide, wherein she shares weekly recipes.

Cookbooks 
A Taste of Home
The Weekend Chef: Easy Food for Lazy Days
Catherine’s Italian Kitchen
E Eat Like An Italian: Recipes for the Good Life
Bake Like An Italian: More Recipes for the Good Life 
Catherine’s Family Kitchen

Personal life
Fulvio was born and brought up in Ballyknocken House, in the village of Glenealy, County Wicklow, Ireland.  She is married to Claudio, who hails from Palermo in Sicily, Italy. They have two children.

Awards and achievements
Tastes Like Home: Best Reality Series, 2021 Taste Awards

Catherine Fulvio: Entrepreneur of the Year 2013, ActionCOACH

Bake Like An Italian: Best Italian Cuisine Cookbook 2015, Gourmand Awards

Eat Like An Italian: Cookbook Of The Year 2012, Bord Gais Energy Irish Book Awards

Ballyknocken Cookery School: Cookery School of the Year 2007, Cordon D’Or Gold Rubbon Culinary Academy Awards

Catherine’s Italian Kitchen: Best Italian Cuisine Cookbook Ireland 2011, Gourmand World Cookbook Awards

Catherine’s Italian Kitchen: Best Television Celebrity Cookbook Ireland 2011, Gourmand World Cookbook Awards

Fulvio’s many other achievements can be found at catherinefulvio.com

References

References

External links
 
 www.catherinefulvio.com
 www.ballyknocken.com
 www.thecookeryschool.ie
 www.rte.ie/food/chefs.html

Irish chefs
Living people
Irish television chefs
1970 births